Northumbrian Minstrelsy is a book of 18th and 19th century North East of England folk songs and pipe music, intended to be a lasting historical record. The book was edited by John Stokoe and the Rev John Collingwood Bruce LL.D., F.S.A., and published by and on behalf of the Society of Antiquaries of Newcastle upon Tyne in 1882. It was reprinted in 1965 by Folklore Associates, Hatboro, Pennsyslvania, with a foreword by A. L. Lloyd.

Details
Northumbrian Minstrelsy was written with the intention of providing a historical record of some of the North Country songs and music. "A book for the collection and preservation of the old music and poetry of the North of England" was what Algernon Percy, 4th Duke of Northumberland had suggested.

The book is divided into two sections; the first giving the lyrics (with some music) of local, now historical songs, and the second part giving the music to many Northumbrian smallpipe tunes with very few lyrics. The book was edited by John Stokoe and the Rev John Collingwood Bruce, with the help of committee members, and published by and behalf, of the Ancient Melodies Committee of the Society of Antiquaries of Newcastle upon Tyne in 1882.

Background 
The project first started in 1855 after Algernon Percy, 4th Duke of Northumberland, patron of the Society of Antiquaries of Newcastle upon Tyne expressed a desire that the Society should turn its attention to the collection and preservation of the old music and poetry of the North East of England. A committee was appointed, consisting of Robert White, John Clerevaulx Fenwick, and William Kell (1797–1862); with Bruce, a member of the society, acting in an ex-officio role.

Robert White, was a farmer's son from Kirk Yetholm, Northumberland, worked all his life in a brass foundry in Newcastle. He was an avid researcher into Northumberland legends, folk lore and folk songs, writing regularly for local newspapers on local matters. John Clerevaulx Fenwick was the son of a lay-preacher, a lawyer by profession, a lover of pipe-music and author of a small (18-page) book "A few remarks upon bagpipes and pipe music". William Kell was the first Town Clerk of Gateshead, elected 1836 to 1854, and also a pipe-music lover, and collector of music relating to the Northumbrian smallpipes. Bruce was a pillar of society: a headmaster, a Moderator of the Presbyterian Church, a founder of the Y.M.C.A., a workhouse guardian, a respected antiquary, etc., etc., and consequently gave much credence to the committee and its work. He was possibly an influence in the omission of slightly bawdy ballads from the final works.

In 1857, after two years there was still no book, and the delays caused some embarrassment to members of the committee. The reasons given in the committee’s apologies included the fact that they did not want to credit any of the work as "Northumbrian" if it were not. As time went on, Kell (1862) and White (1870) died, and Fenwick moved his law practice to London. In the meantime, John Stokoe had been appointed to the Committee. He had for many years been transcribing and copying out, by hand, many songs, lyrics and/or music, and had collected a large number.

The committee now had numerous other sources to choose from, including Joseph Ritson's Bishopric Garland and Northumberland Garland, John Bell's Rhymes of Northern Bards and Joseph Crawhall II's Tunes for the Northumbrian small Pipes. These then, together with the collected papers of its committee members, were the main sources of Northumbrian Minstrelsy, but works from other similar compilations were considered and used. There appears to have been relatively little collecting in the field.

When John Stokoe joined the team on the committee, the work moved forward. The various sources and manuscripts were sifted, collated and ordered. A final selection was made, enabling publication too occur finally in 1882.

The publication 
Northumbrian Minstrelsy is a book of Border ballads, Northumbrian folk songs and Northumbrian pipe music consisting of over 200 pages. It contains 132 song lyrics and over 100 pieces of music, and was published in 1882. It is divided into the two sections; the first song lyrics, the second pipe music where only a handful of pieces have lyrics. There is little in the way of biographies of the writers of the music or lyrics, but some information on the histories of the events and a considerable amount on the history of the music.

The selection however has been made from the point of musical and prose quality rather than the popularity of the (sometimes slightly coarse) songs of the period. In addition several of the songs have been "modified" from the original versions for inclusion in this book.

Contents 

Note – The page numbers refer to those in the 1965 reprinted edition, and may differ from the original 100+ year old edition.

Notes
Tune-Br -The tune is not given in the book – but it has been added as attributed in Brockie's The Shields Garland
Tune-Cr -The tune is not given in the book – but it has been added as attributed in Joseph Crawhall's A Beuk o' Newcassel Sangs, 1888

See also
Allan's Illustrated Edition of Tyneside Songs and Readings
A Beuk o’ Newcassell Sangs Collected by Joseph Crawhall 1888
Rhymes of Northern Bards
Music of Northumbria

References

External links
 Northumbrian Minstrelsy

English folk songs
Songs related to Newcastle upon Tyne
Northumbrian folklore
Song books